Moon Falls, also spelled Moonfalls, is a waterfall located on the west edge of the Umpqua National Forest in Lane County, in the U.S. state of Oregon. It totals 100 feet fall in one wide veiling cascade and is 1.5 miles from Spirit Falls trailhead.

Description
Alex Creek, from which the waterfall is produced, mostly flows during the winter months, hence it loses much of its volume later in the Summer.

Trails
A paved foot trail loops through mixed forest stands that starts at the trailhead off spur route #1702-203, approximately 50 mi from the town of Oakridge. It totals 1 miles out and back of easy hiking. Moonfalls trail is located in the Layng Creek Municipal Watershed and overnight camping is not allowed.

See also 
 List of waterfalls in Oregon

References 

Waterfalls of Lane County, Oregon
Parks in Lane County, Oregon